To Love is a 2003 Mandarin album by Beijing-based C-pop singer Faye Wong.

To Love is Wong's 19th official studio album, and the first to be released by Sony Music Asia.  it remains her last album to date. Released on 7 November 2003, it has 13 tracks: 10 in Mandarin and 3 in Cantonese. Wong wrote the music and lyrics for 3 songs, the title track "To Love", "Leave Nothing" (不留) and "Sunshine Dearest" (陽寶), as well as the music for "April Snow" (四月雪).

Before the album's release, the Cantonese version of the title track "In the Name of Love" (假愛之名), with lyrics by Lin Xi, was banned in some areas such as mainland China and Malaysia because the lyrics mentioned opium. Interviewed in December 2003, Wong said that she preferred her own Mandarin version of the song, which made no reference to drugs.

Wong said that her favourite track was "MV", written by Nicholas Tse with whom she had had an on-off romance. She admitted that her song "Leave Nothing" was a reflection of her love life, but declined to identify the other persons referred to in the lyrics.

The album also includes "Passenger" (乘客), a cover of Sophie Zelmani's "Going Home".

Asked about the pattern of 2-character titles for the songs, Wong said that this was not important, but reflects a modern habit of abbreviating things in everyday speech.

Reception
To Love was more successful than her previous self-titled album, both financially and critically. It sold more than one million copies in Asia within a week of its release, half of those within China. Afterwards, she held numerous successful concerts for over a year; ticket sales in Hong Kong set a new record.

Taipei Times called it a mixture of "saccharine pop and daring avant-garde".

Variations
"All-In" versions were issued with the music videos on VCD and DVD. These versions had a different cover with a portrait of Faye Wong printed in black on a red background.

Track listing

Tracks 1–10 are in Mandarin, and the last three are Cantonese. 
Tracks 12 and 13 are Cantonese versions of tracks 1 and 5 respectively.

References

2003 albums
Faye Wong albums
Sony Music Taiwan albums
Mandopop albums